Paxtons Head is a Grade II listed public house at 153 Knightsbridge, London.

It was built in 1900–02 by George Dennis Martin as part of the Park Mansions development.

References

Grade II listed pubs in the City of Westminster
Knightsbridge
George Dennis Martin buildings